Nir District is in Taft County, Yazd province, Iran. At the 2006 National Census, its population was 14,531 in 4,417 households. The following census in 2011 counted 7,178 people in 2,470 households. At the latest census in 2016, the district had 6,625 inhabitants in 2,517 households.

References 

Taft County

Districts of Yazd Province

Populated places in Yazd Province

Populated places in Taft County